Salzgitter-Ringelsheim station is a station in the town of Salzgitter in the German state of Lower Saxony. It is located in the extreme southwest of the urban area in the district of Salzgitter-Ringelheim. Salzgitter has no central station and Salzgitter-Ringelsheim station, despite its remote location, is the main station in Salzgitter.

Infrastructure

The station is a railway junction, built as the through station lying east-west. The Brunswick–Kreiensen railway and the Hildesheim–Goslar railway, which intersect here, are not electrified. It is served by Regionalbahn and Regional-Express trains. It is classified by Deutsche Bahn as a category 5 station.

Rail services

History

The Brunswick Southern Railway (Brunswick–Kreiensen railway) was built from Brunswick towards Kreiensen through the south of modern urban area of Salzgitter in 1856, passing through Salzgitter station—now called Salzgitter Bad station—and Ringelheim (Harz).  The rail network in the Salzgitter area was extensively remodelled between 1938 and 1958. In Ringelsheim station, the Brunswick–Kreiensen railway crossed the Hildesheim–Grauhof section of the Hildesheim–Goslar railway completed by the Hanover-Altenbeken Railway Company  in 1875 to connect with the Halberstadt–Vienenburg railway of the Magdeburg–Halberstadt Railway Company. At this time a station building was built to a Harz design. It was demolished in the late 1980s. Salzgitter Ringelsheim station has been modernised since 2000.

References

Footnotes

Sources
 
 

Railway stations in Lower Saxony
Buildings and structures in Salzgitter
Railway stations in Germany opened in 1856